Emmaculate Msipa (born 7 June 1992) is a Zimbabwean footballer, who plays as a midfielder for Turkish Women's Super League club Fatih Karagümrük and the Zimbabwe women's national team.

Club career

End December 2021, Msipa moved to Turkey and joined the newly established Istanbul club Fatih Karagümrük to play in the 2021-22 Turkcell Women's Super League.

International career
Msipa represented Zimbabwe at the 2016 Summer Olympics. She also played at the 2011 All-Africa Games.

References

External links

1992 births
Living people
Sportspeople from Harare
Zimbabwean women's footballers
Women's association football midfielders
Zimbabwe women's international footballers
Olympic footballers of Zimbabwe
Footballers at the 2016 Summer Olympics
Zimbabwean expatriate footballers
Zimbabwean expatriate sportspeople in Spain
Expatriate women's footballers in Spain
Zimbabwean expatriate sportspeople in Turkey
Expatriate women's footballers in Turkey
Fatih Karagümrük S.K. (women's football) players
Turkish Women's Football Super League players